An indirect election for Seanad Éireann took place after the 2020 Irish general election, with postal ballots due on 30 and 31 March. The Seanad is the upper house of the Oireachtas, with Dáil Éireann as the lower house of representatives. The election was held for 49 of the 60 seats in the Seanad: 43 are elected for five vocational panels, and six are elected in two university constituencies. The remaining 11 senators are nominated by the newly elected Taoiseach when the Dáil reconvenes after the general election.

Background
The Constitution of Ireland provides that a Seanad election must take place within 90 days of the dissolution of the Dáil Éireann. As the Dáil was dissolved on 14 January, the latest day the election could take place is 13 April 2020. On 21 January 2020, the Minister for Housing, Planning and Local Government signed an order for the Seanad elections, providing 30 March as the deadline for ballots for the vocational panels and 31 March as the deadline for ballots in the university constituencies.

On 8 February 2020, the members of the 33rd Dáil were elected in the general election. The Fine Gael-led government, led by Taoiseach Leo Varadkar was defeated, with Sinn Féin taking the most first preference votes, and Fianna Fáil taking the most seats. The Sinn Féin victory came as a surprise and an upset, as it ended the two-party rule of Fine Gael and Fianna Fáil that had existed for many decades, and polls did not show Sinn Féin winning until the election was called. Sinn Féin won 37 seats, Fianna Fáil won 38, and Fine Gael won 35.

Electoral system
Of the forty-nine elected seats, three are elected from the university constituency of the National University and three are elected from the university constituency of Dublin University (Trinity College Dublin).

Forty-three are elected by an electorate of elected politicians, consisting of members of the 33rd Dáil, members of the 25th Seanad and city and county councillors, who each have five ballots for vocational panels. The Seanad Returning Officer maintains a list of qualified nominating bodies for each panel. Candidates may be nominated by nominating bodies (outside sub-panel) or by members of the Oireachtas (inside sub-panel). In each vocational panel, there is a minimum number who must be elected from either the inside or the outside sub-panel. If the number of candidates nominated for each sub-panel does not exceed by two the maximum number which may be elected from that sub-panel, the Taoiseach shall nominate candidates to fill the deficiency.

Electors for the Panels elect:
 Seven seats from the Administrative Panel, with a minimum of three from inside and outside sub-panels: Public administration and social services (including the voluntary sector).
 Eleven seats from the Agricultural Panel, with a minimum of four: Agriculture and the fisheries.
 Five seats from the Cultural and Educational Panel, with a minimum of two: Education, the arts, the Irish language and Irish culture and literature.
 Nine seats from the Industrial and Commercial Panel, with a minimum of three: Industry and commerce (including engineering and architecture).
 Eleven seats from the Labour Panel, with a minimum of four: Labour (organised or otherwise).

All votes are cast by postal ballot, and are counted using the single transferable vote. Under this system, voters can rank candidates in order of their preference, 1 as their first preference, 2 for second preference, and so on. Ballots are initially given a value of 1,000 to allow calculation of quotas where all ballots are distributed in the case of a surplus, rather than taking a representative sample as is done in Dáil elections.

The 11 nominated members can only be appointed by the Taoiseach who is appointed next after the reassembly of Dáil Éireann. They are usually appointed after the Seanad election, but if a Taoiseach has not been appointed at stage, they will not be appointed until then.

Members of the outgoing Seanad not seeking election

Election process

Impact of coronavirus
Because of the coronavirus outbreak, changes to the usual arrangements for the Vocational Panel elections were made to reduce the risk of transmission. The clerk and deputy clerk of the Dáil and Seanad refused to witness Oireachtas members' ballots, advising them to use the local government chief executive or Garda (police) superintendent for this purpose. The Seanad clerk, as returning officer, also requested that counting agents not be present at the count centre in Dublin Castle. Similar appeals were made regarding the NUI count in the RDS and the Dublin University count in the university's Examination Hall.

Results

National University of Ireland

Dublin University

Administrative Panel

Agricultural Panel

Cultural and Educational Panel

Industrial and Commercial Panel

Labour Panel

References

Footnotes

Citations

 
Seanad
2020 elections in the Republic of Ireland
2020
March 2020 events in Ireland